The Chengdu Ring Expressway, designated as G4202, is ring expressway in Chengdu, Sichuan, China. The six-lane expressway was opened on 16 December 2001 and it connects multiple expressways in Chengdu.

History
The expressway was originally called Chengdu No. 1 Ring Expressway and had a construction cost of 4.3 billion yuan, with a total length of 85 kilometers, a design speed of 100 kilometers per hour, and emergency shoulder lanes. There are 11 interchange overpasses and 30 separate overpasses along the road, which were officially opened to traffic on 16 December 2001.

Toll
Since 1 December 2019, only vehicles registered in Chengdu that are equipped with ETC devices can enjoy the preferential policy of free passage when passing the above two expressways. The county government finances the unified payment of expressway tolls. Vehicles registered in Chengdu that are not equipped with ETC devices are required to bear the expressway vehicle tolls by themselves.

References

Chinese national-level expressways
Expressways in Sichuan
Transport in Chengdu